Genetic heterogeneity occurs through the production of single or similar phenotypes through different genetic mechanisms. There are two types of genetic heterogeneity: allelic heterogeneity, which occurs when a similar phenotype is produced by different alleles within the same gene; and locus heterogeneity, which occurs when a similar phenotype is produced by mutations at different loci.

Role in medical disorders
Marked genetic heterogeneity is correlated to multiple levels of causation in many common human diseases including cystic fibrosis, Alzheimer's disease, autism spectrum disorders, inherited predisposition to breast cancer, and non-syndromic hearing loss. These levels of causation are complex and occur through: (1) rare, individual mutations that when combined contribute to the development of common diseases; (2) the accumulation of many different rare, individual mutations within the same gene that contribute to the development of the same common disease within different individuals; (3) the accumulation of many different rare, individual mutations within the same gene that contribute to the development of different phenotypic variations of the same common disease within different individuals; and (4) the development of the same common disease in different individuals through different mutations. Increased understanding of the role of genetic heterogeneity and the mechanisms through which it produces common disease phenotypes will facilitate the development of effective prevention and treatment methods for these diseases.

Cystic Fibrosis 

Cystic fibrosis is an inherited autosomal recessive genetic disorder that occurs through a mutation in a single gene that codes for the cystic fibrosis transmembrane conductance regulator. Research has identified over 2,000 cystic fibrosis associated mutations in the gene encoding for the cystic fibrosis transmembrane conductance regulator at varying degrees of frequency within the disease carrying population.  These mutations also produce varying degrees of disease phenotypes, and may also work in combinations to produce additive phenotypic effects.

Alzheimer's disease 

Alzheimer's disease is a complicated neurodegenerative disorder with multiple phenotypic subtypes, including clinical and preclinical, that result from different genetic origins. Current research on the amyloid cascade hypothesis has identified rare mutations in three genes that encode the amyloid precursor protein (APP), presenilin 1 (PS-1), and presenilin 2 (PS-2) that cause the autosomal dominant, early-onset form of familial Alzheimer's disease. Research has also discovered the association of a fourth allele, apolipoprotein E4 (ApoE4), in the development of late-onset and sporadic forms of the disease, although the pathology of its role is still largely unknown.

Autism spectrum disorders 

Autism spectrum disorders are among the most highly heritable psychiatric disorders and display high levels of phenotypic variability. Disorders on the Autism spectrum have high levels of genetic heterogeneity and result from multiple genetic pathways including single gene mutation disorders (such as Fragile X Syndrome), regional and submicroscopic variations in the number of gene copies (either heritable or de novo), rare and common genetic variants, and chromosomal aberrations.

Inherited predisposition to breast cancer 

Mutations in ten different genes have been found to contribute to a heritable increased risk of breast cancer and other cancer syndromes. These genes, when functional, contribute to a pathway that serves to preserve genomic integrity. Mutations in BRCA1 and BRCA2 result in a high risk of both breast and ovarian cancers.  Mutations in p53 and PTEN increase risks of breast cancer associated with rare cancer syndromes. Mutations in CHECK2, ATM, NBS1, RAD50, BRIP1, and PALB2 can double the risk of breast cancer development. Biallelic mutations, in which both copies of a particular gene are mutated, in BRCA2, BRIP1, and PALB2 also cause Fanconi anemia, a recessive syndrome that leads to progressive bone marrow failure.

Non-syndromic hearing loss 

Non-syndromic hearing loss can occur through multiple pathways including autosomal dominant, autosomal recessive, X-linked, and Y-linked inheritance patterns. 69 genes and 145 loci have been discovered to be involved in the genetic heterogeneity of non-syndromic hearing loss, and the phenotype of the disorder is largely associated with its pattern of inheritance.

Studying genetic heterogeneity 
Initial research on genetic heterogeneity was conducted using genetic linkage analyses, which map genetic loci of related individuals to identify genomic differences. Current research now relies largely on genome-wide association studies which examine the association of single-nucleotide polymorphisms (SNPs) to a particular disease in a population.

References 

Classical genetics